Baldwin Middle-Senior High School is a public secondary school in Baldwin, Florida, United States, part of the Duval County School District. Located within the Baldwin city limits, the school has a middle school and a high school.

Academics
The school currently has a "B" as of 2017 on the Florida School Accountability Grading Scale.

References

Educational institutions established in 1949
High schools in Jacksonville, Florida
Duval County Public Schools
Public high schools in Florida
Public middle schools in Florida
1949 establishments in Florida